The 1959 World Fencing Championships were held in Budapest, Hungary.

Medal table

Medal summary

Men's events

Women's events

References

FIE Results

World Fencing Championships
1959 in Hungarian sport
International fencing competitions hosted by Hungary
1950s in Budapest
International sports competitions in Budapest
1959 in fencing